Mbata Kingdom is the traditional name of a Bantu kingdom to the north of the Mpemba Kasi, until merging with that state to form the Kingdom of Kongo around 1375 CE.

The founding myth of the Kingdom of Kongo begins with the marriage of Nima a Nzima to Luqueni Luansanze, the daughter of Nsa-cu-Clau the chief of the Mbata people. Their marriage would solidify the alliance between the Mpemba Kasi and the neighbouring Mbata people, an alliance which would become the foundation of the Kingdom of Kongo. Nima a Nzima and Luqueni Luansanze had a child named Lukeni lua Nimi, who would become the first person to take the title of Mutinù (King)

References

Bantu
14th century in Africa